Circaea alpina, commonly called alpine enchanter's nightshade or small enchanter's nightshade, is a 10–30 cm tall perennial herb found in cool forests of the Northern Hemisphere.

Description
The leaves are opposite, ovate, 2–6 cm and coarsely dentate. The  petioles have a wing beneath. The flowers and fruits are clustered near the top of the fruiting raceme; each raceme bears 15 or less white or pink flowers in mid-May through early September. The fruit is a small bur with one seed. C. alpina can reproduce vegetatively and via stolons.

Distribution
In North America, Circaea alpina is distributed throughout all of Canada and North Carolina through Maine and New Mexico through Washington. In Eurasia, the range of C. alpina includes Northern Europe south to Albania and Bulgaria and east to Korea and Japan. C. alpina prefers a moist, upland habitat.

Hybrids 
Circaea alpina will hybridize with Circaea lutetiana producing sterile offspring that persists in vegetative colonies.

References

External links

alpina
Plants described in 1753
Taxa named by Carl Linnaeus
Flora of North America